Derek Ray Lokey (born November 25, 1985) is a former American football defensive tackle. He was signed by the Kansas City Chiefs as an undrafted free agent in 2008. He played college football at Texas.

External links
Kansas City Chiefs bio

1985 births
Living people
People from Nacogdoches, Texas
Players of American football from Texas
American football defensive tackles
Texas Longhorns football players
Kansas City Chiefs players